Khivi (1506–1582) also referred to as Mata Khivi or Bibi Khivi was the wife of the second Sikh guru Angad, best known for establishing the Sikh tradition of langar or free kitchen.

Early life

Khivi was born in 1506 into a Marwaha Khatri family to Devi Chand and Karan Devi in village Sangar Kot near Khadoor Sahib. Devi Chand was a businessman and money lender. She was married to Lehna, a resident of Khadoor Sahib in 1519 at the age of 13, who went on to become second guru of Sikhs and was named Guru Angad Dev. The couple had four children; two sons Datu and Dasu and two daughters Anokhi and Bibi Amro. According to some sources, the couple only had three children (omitting Anokhi). Khivi lived for 30 years after her husband's death to the age of 75.

Langar service 
After Guru Nanak's initiation, Khivi continued the system of langar or free kitchen and administered it. It was popularly known as Mata Khivi ji da Langar (Mother Khivi's langar) and she was monumental in institutionalising the Sikh tradition of langar. She was also instrumental in making the Sewa (service) tradition in Sikh temples.

See also
 Langar

References

External links
Biography

1506 births
1582 deaths
Family members of the Sikh gurus
Punjabi people